Argophyllum lejourdanii is a plant in the Argophyllaceae family endemic to a part of north eastern Queensland, Australia. It was described and named in 1863.

Taxonomy
This species was first described (as A. lejourdani) in 1863 by the by the German-born  Australian botanist Ferdinand von Mueller who published it in his work Fragmenta Phytographiae Australiae. In a 1900 review published in The Queensland Flora, Frederick Manson Bailey described a new subspecies L. l. var. cryptophleba and respelled the species epithet with an extra "i", making it lejourdanii, presumably as a correction of the Latin grammar. More than a hundred years later, Anthony Bean and Paul Forster conducted a wide-scale review of the genus in which they redefined A. lejourdanii and described seven new species—including promoting A. l. var. cryptophleba to species status as Argophyllum cryptophlebum. They publishing their findings in the Journal Austrobaileya in 2018.

The type specimen for this species was collected in 1863 in the Kennedy District of north Queensland by John Dallachy.

Etymology
The genus name Argophyllum is derived from Ancient Greek Árgos meaning white or shining, and phúllon meaning leaf. It refers to the white colouration of the underside of the leaves. The species epithet lejourdanii is named for Alfred Lejourdan who was one of Mueller's correspondents.

Distribution and habitat
It usually inhabits open forest but is also found on the edges of rainforest, near rocky outcrops, and along stream margins.

Conservation
This species is listed by the Queensland Department of Environment and Science as least concern. , it has not been assessed by the IUCN.

References

External links
 

 View a map of historical sightings of this species at the Australasian Virtual Herbarium
 View observations of this species on iNaturalist
 View images of this species on Flickriver

Endemic flora of Queensland
Taxa named by Ferdinand von Mueller
Taxa named by Frederick Manson Bailey
Argophyllaceae
Plants described in 1863